Fred Kirkham (born Frederick Angus Benfield, 5 April 1937 – 25 October 2007) was an Australian Olympic-level rower, songwriter and judge.

Early life
Kirkham was born in Leichhardt, New South Wales and attended Newington College (1945–1953). During his adolescence he was known as Fred Benfield but reverted to his mother's maiden name as an adult.

Olympic representation
At the 1956 Summer Olympics in Melbourne, Victoria, Kirkham rowed in the Bronze medal-winning men's eight.

Police and legal career
For twenty years Kirkham served as a member of the New South Wales Police Force. Kirkham served as a uniformed officer for several years before training to join the NSW Police Drug Squad.

After completing his HSC at the age of 30, Kirkham attended night school to complete his law degree. He was admitted to the New South Wales Bar in 1974 and practiced mainly in the area of personal injury. After 14 years at the Bar he was appointed a Judge of the District Court of New South Wales in 1988 where he served until his retirement.

Music career
In 1963, Kirkham co-wrote The Delltones' hit song Hangin' Five with Ben Acton.

Community activities
He served as President of the Old Newingtonians' Union at the time of its Centenary (1995–1996).

References

External links
 

1937 births
2007 deaths
Australian male rowers
Australian police officers
People educated at Newington College
Old Newingtonians' Union presidents
Olympic rowers of Australia
Olympic bronze medalists for Australia
Rowers at the 1956 Summer Olympics
Olympic medalists in rowing
Medalists at the 1956 Summer Olympics
20th-century Australian judges
21st-century Australian judges